Matthew James Moy (born February 3, 1984) is an American actor and artist. He co-starred as Han Lee on the CBS sitcom 2 Broke Girls and provides the voice of Lars Barriga on Steven Universe and Steven Universe Future.

Early life and education
Moy was born and raised in San Francisco, California. Moy is a 
fourth-generation Chinese-American. He attended the University of California, Davis, graduating with a bachelor's degree in Japanese and a minor in linguistics. Moy's father was a high school teacher, while his mother was a language therapist. He has one older sister.

Career

Television
Moy has appeared on several television shows, including How I Met Your Mother, Criminal Minds, Zeke and Luther, Good Luck Charlie, and Kickin' It, and had a recurring role as Shawn the Mathlete on iCarly. He played Trang in the ninth season of the sitcom Scrubs. He has also made guest star appearances on Big Time Rush as famous blogger Deke and on The Middle as Takayuki, the Heck family's Japanese foreign exchange student. He appeared on the fifth episode of the Syfy reality game show Cha$e and voices Lars Barriga on the Cartoon Network animated series Steven Universe, a role which has earned him critical praise.

Moy co-starred as Han Lee on the CBS sitcom 2 Broke Girls, from 2011 to 2017. Moy's character was criticized by writer Andrew Ti as perpetuating "every possible Yellow Panic stereotype with an actually fairly impressive level of thoroughness" and his use of broken English was characterized as being played "like some sorry minstrel show." Moy responded to criticism by stating that "[w]e’re a comedy, and we often go right to the edge. It doesn’t bother me. I’ve encountered this all my life. I’ve been made fun of all my life." In July 2017 Moy was cast as Zack Smith/Microbe in Marvel's New Warriors on Freeform. While a pilot was filmed, Freeform dropped the series and it was ultimately cancelled after languishing for a year.

Film
Moy played Ron, Grover's best friend, in the 2010 independent film The Grover Complex. He played Chuck in the 2011 film No Strings Attached opposite Ashton Kutcher and Natalie Portman.

Video games
Moy voiced Firefly in the 2009 video game G.I. Joe: The Rise of Cobra, Raus in White Knight Chronicles, and Shroomboom in the Skylanders reboot of the franchise.

Artwork
When not acting, Moy enjoys drawing and painting, as evidenced by his Instagram account. He has credited Rebecca Sugar with giving him additional painting lessons during his time on Steven Universe.

Personal life

Moy resides in Los Angeles. When not acting or painting, Moy enjoys cooking, writing, and traveling.

In 2012, during the filming of the second season of 2 Broke Girls, Moy unknowingly suffered a minor stroke in his sleep, waking to feeling weakness and motor skill loss in his right side. He drove himself to urgent care, and doctors discovered bleeding in his brain, but no further deterioration. The loss of motor skills in Moy's right side required a year of physical therapy, including walking with a cane for assistance on sets and re-learning to write with his right hand, but he has since made a full recovery. Moy kept the incident private from media until 2017.

Filmography

References

External links

1984 births
21st-century American male actors
American male actors of Chinese descent
American male film actors
American male television actors
American male video game actors
American male voice actors
Living people
Male actors from San Francisco
University of California, Davis alumni
American artists
American artists of Chinese descent